The 9th International Film Festival of India was held from  3-16 January 1983 in New Delhi. The festival introduced new section for screening of 16mm films. Twenty-two Third World countries have participated in the edition, and has become a major forum of Third World cinema. For the first time the  Golden Peacock Awards for Best feature film, and short film were not awarded in the competition section.

Winners
Golden Peacock (Best Film):  Not Awarded
Golden Peacock (Best Short Film) Not Awarded

References

1983 film festivals
09
1983 in Indian cinema